PT Siloam International Hospitals Tbk or Siloam Hospitals is a chain of healthcare facilities in Indonesia founded in 2008 by PT. Lippo Karawaci Tbk. It is a publicly listed company which is part of Lippo Group.

History
It was established on August 3, 1996, as Siloam Gleneagles Hospital that was a collaboration between Lippo Group and Gleneagles Hospital, founded  through PT Sentralindo Wirasta which is engaged in health services. The Siloam Gleneagles Hospital was first built in Lippo Village and Lippo Cikarang. 

Siloam is now the largest hospital chain in Indonesia. As of September 2021, the chain operates 40 Siloam hospitals and 30 Siloam clinics (6 in Papua). Siloam served 1,705 million outpatient and 126 thousand as of September 2021. Siloam is the first hospital in Indonesia to receive an accreditation by the Joint Commission International (JCI) from the United States. Some other medical achievements are: Siloam ASRI conducted the 100th successful kidney transplant surgery and Siloam Hospitals TB Simatupang received Gold Status from World Stroke Organization (WSO) in handling stroke patients.

Siloam Hospitals Group also operates Mochtar Riady Institute of Nanotechnology (MRIN) and the Pelita Harapan University School of Medicine and School of Nursing.

References

Hospitals in Indonesia
Indonesian brands
Hospital networks
Companies based in Jakarta
Indonesian companies established in 1996
Companies listed on the Indonesia Stock Exchange
2013 initial public offerings